Ramsey Faragher is the Founder, President, and CTO of Focal Point Positioning Ltd, and the Chairman and President of Focal Point Positioning Inc. He is also a Bye-Fellow of Queens' College and lives in Cambridge with his wife and three children. Previously he was a Senior Research Associate at the University of Cambridge Computer Laboratory in England, working in the Digital Technology Group on infrastructure-free smartphone positioning.

Education 

Faragher graduated with a Bachelor of Arts, and Master of Science degrees in Experimental and Theoretical Physics from the University of Cambridge in 2004. In 2008 he was awarded a PhD, supervised by Peter Duffett Smith with a thesis on the Effects of Multipath Interference on Radio Positioning Systems.

Industry 

On completing his PhD, Faragher worked for BAE systems where he was a Technical Lead for a number of navigation, tracking and sensor fusion programmes, building on expertise in GPS-Denied navigation using novel methods including opportunistic radio signals. He also developed the award-winning NAVSOP positioning suite. In 2014 Faragher was awarded a Fellowship by the Royal Institute of Navigation in recognition of his accomplishments.

His work in industry was also recognised by Top Gear, who described Faragher as a real-life Q. In 2020 Faragher was named by Wired magazine as one of 32 innovators who are building a better future.

Faragher founded Focal Point Positioning in 2015 with members of the original NAVSOP team. In June 2020 Focal Point Positioning was awarded both The Duke of Edinburgh's Navigation Award for Outstanding Technical Achievement from the Royal Institute of Navigation, and the Hottest SpaceTech Startup in Europe accolade from the Europas.

References

External links 
 Ramsey Faragher's home page at the Computer Laboratory
 Focal Point Positioning
 Computer Laboratory
 Queens' College

Living people
Alumni of Churchill College, Cambridge
Fellows of Queens' College, Cambridge
Academics of the University of Cambridge
Members of the University of Cambridge Computer Laboratory
1981 births